The inferior cerebral veins are veins that drain the undersurface of the cerebral hemispheres and empty into the cavernous and transverse sinuses.

Those on the orbital surface of the frontal lobe join the superior cerebral veins, and through these open into the superior sagittal sinus.

Those of the temporal lobe anastomose with the middle cerebral and basal veins, and join the cavernous, sphenoparietal, and superior petrosal sinuses.

Image

References

Veins of the head and neck